Steven S. Rogers (born c. 1959) is an American academic. He is the MBA Class of 1957 Senior Lecturer of Business Administration at the Harvard Business School. He is the co-author of a book, and the author of 14 business cases featuring African-American businesspeople.

Early life
Steven S. Rogers was born circa 1959. He grew up on the South Side of Chicago. He graduated from Williams College, and he earned a master in business administration from the Harvard Business School in 1985.

Career
Rogers taught at Northwestern University's Kellogg School of Management. He is now the MBA Class of 1957 Senior Lecturer of Business Administration at the Harvard Business School. He was a visiting professor at the United States Military Academy in 2016.

Rogers is the co-author of a book, and the author of 14 business cases featuring African-American businesspeople.

Rogers is a strategic advisor to OCA Venture Partners.

Works

References

Living people
1950s births
People from Chicago
Williams College alumni
Harvard Business School alumni
Harvard Business School faculty
African-American academics
21st-century African-American people
20th-century African-American people